The IWBF World Wheelchair Basketball Championship is an international wheelchair basketball competition contested by the men's and the women's national teams of the members of the International Wheelchair Basketball Federation (IWBF), the sport's global governing body. 

The first unofficial Wheelchair Basketball World Championships for men was held in 1973,  with Bruges, Belgium being the first host city. The unofficial world championship for men was won by Great Britain, with a team that included Philip Craven, who would later become the President of the International Paralympic Committee (IPC). Bruges, Belgium also hosted the first official World Championships, known as the Gold Cup tournament, in 1975. 

The men's world championships has been won 6 times by the United States, twice each by Australia and Great Britain (one of which being the unofficial Championship in 1973), and once each by Israel, France and Canada. Wheelchair basketball world championships for women have been held since 1990. In the first 6 women's world championships, Canada has won four world titles, and the United States two world titles.

Winners 

* Unofficial Championship

Results

Summaries

Men

* Unofficial Championship

Women

Medal table

Men
As of 2018

Women
As of 2018

References

External links
 World Championships Results, International Wheelchair Basketball Federation (IWBF)
Official site of the World Wheelchair Basketball Championships 2010, British Wheelchair Basketball (archived)
Canada to host 2 Wheelchair World Championships, basketball.ca, October 23, 2009 
Chronology of Events in the Development of Wheelchair Basketball, International Wheelchair Basketball Federation (IWBF) 
Korea awarded 2014 Men's World Champiohship, International Wheelchair Basketball Federation (IWBF), April 9, 2010 
World Championship Wheelchair Basketball - Gold Cup 2006, Archived copy at the Wayback Machine 
 International Wheelchair Basketball Federation (IWBF)

 
Basketball
Wheelchair basketball competitions between national teams
Recurring sporting events established in 1973